Tokyo Juliet is a 2006 Taiwanese drama starring Ariel Lin, Wu Chun of Fahrenheit and Simon Yam. It is based on Japanese manga series Tokyo Juliet, written by Miyuki Kitagawa. It was produced by Comic Productions (可米製作股份有限公司) and directed by Mingtai Wang (王明台). It was broadcast on cable TV Gala Television (GTV) Variety Show/CH 28 (八大綜合台) on 3 June 2006 to 23 September 2006.

At the time the drama was filmed, Wu Chun was a relatively new actor and spoke unsatisfactory Mandarin, so producers had his voice dubbed over by Julian Yang.

Synopsis
Lai Sui is an upcoming fashion designer who had her designs "Little Daisy", which she drew when she was 5 years old, stolen  by Chu Xing (Simon Yam), a fashion 'genius'. Even though Chu Xing is a fashion genius, he still feels the need to steal designs from an up-and-coming designer. Sui believes this theft is the cause of her parents' separation, because her mother left her father for Chu Xing after he dedicated the "Little Daisy" clothing line to her since she had been one of his models.  At the opening ceremony of her university, Bao Cheng Institute, she openly embarrasses and challenges Chu Xing, promising she will become a much more prominent designer than him and cause his downfall.  Privately, Sui also vowed she would not fall in love until her promise is fulfilled.  However, she soon changes her mind when she meets the attractive, flirty and popular senior Ji Feng Liang (Wu Chun).  To her dismay, she finds out that he is both Chu Xing's one and only son and the young boy she knew at that party!  There are many surprises in store for Sui as she tries to outmaneuver Chu Xing's plans to ruin her while still striving to keep a steady relationship with Liang. Then again, in the world of fashion nothing is secure...

Cast

Main cast 
Ariel Lin as Lin Lai Sui (林瀨穗)
Wu Chun (吳尊) as Ji Feng Liang (紀風亮)
Ray Chang as Ah Si (鄭內司)
Simon Yam as Chu Xing (褚形)
Tang Zhi Ping (唐治平) as Ai Li Ou (艾利歐)

Supporting cast 
Alien Huang (黃鴻升) as Lu Yi Mi (陸一彌)
Tomohisa Kagami (加賀美智久) as Ke Xing (克行)
Lu Jia Xin (路嘉欣) as Gan Li Sha (甘理沙)
Janel Tsai (蔡淑臻) as Gao Gang Quan (高岡泉)
Cai Yi Zhen (蔡宜臻) as Pei Mei Zi (裴美子)
Wu Jun Qiang (吳君強) as Guang Xi (光希)
Alexia Gao (高伊玲) as You Qi
Jane Wang as Sui's mother/Chu Xing's Wife
Roger Sheung as Ah Gong

Soundtrack

Tokyo Juliet Original Soundtrack was released on June 8, 2006 by various artists under HIM International Music It contains 13 tracks, in which 6 tracks are various instrumental versions of the songs. The opening theme is track 1 "Upwind 逆風" by Garden Sister, while the closing theme is track 3 "I'm No One's But Yours 非你莫屬" by Ariel Lin. The Soundtrack also comes with a bonus VCD.

Track listing

Bonus VCD

See also
 Tokyo Juliet (manga)

References

External links
  GTV Tokyo Juliet official homepage

Taiwanese drama television series
Gala Television original programming
2006 Taiwanese television series debuts
2006 Taiwanese television series endings
Taiwanese television dramas based on manga